Jean-Louis Bessé (born July 5, 1980) is a retired footballer who played as a forward. Born in the Ivory Coast, he also played at the international level with the Quebec national soccer team.

Playing career

Early career 
Bessé began his Canadian career in 2000 in the provincial circuit the Ligue de Soccer Elite Quebec (LSEQ) with Francheville. In 2004, he began playing at the college level with UQTR Patriotes. After the conclusion of the college season, he was invited to briefly train with the Toledo Slayers of the USL Premier Development League. In 2006, he was named the Male Athlete of the Year and was selected to the CIS all-star team. 

He returned to the regional LSEQ in 2006 to play with Trois-Rivières Sélect where he scored 11 goals finishing as the third-highest goalscorer. During his stint in Trois-Rivières, he played in a friendly match against Montreal Impact. For the remainder of the season, he played in the interprovincial Canadian Soccer League with Laval Dynamites.

Trois-Rivières 
The following CSL season, he signed with expansion franchise Trois-Rivières Attak. He made his debut on May 13 against Toronto Croatia in a scoreless draw. He scored his first goal on May 20, 2007, in a 2-1 over the Canadian Lions. He helped Attak to claim their first piece of silverware by claiming the Open Canada Cup. He helped Trois-Rivières achieve an 18-game undefeated streak and clinched a postseason berth by finishing second in the National Division. Their playoff run ended on October 21, 2007, against the Serbian White Eagles in the semifinals.

He re-signed with Attak for the 2008 season. In his second term with Trois-Rivières, he assisted the club in securing their first National Division title and helped the club reach a 13-game undefeated streak. In the postseason he contributed by scoring the opening goal in a 2-0 victory over the St. Catharines Wolves in the quarterfinal match. He featured in the CSL Championship final, where the Attak was defeated by the Serbian White Eagles, which ended in a 2-2 draw and was decided on penalties by a score of 2-1.  

In 2009, the club began to change its philosophical approach and begin to transition into a developmental system for its parent club the Montreal Impact. The result of these changes saw less recruitment of players from the Trois-Rivières region and more from Montreal.

Montreal Impact 
In the same season, Besse was loaned out to the Montreal Impact in the USL First Division. He made his debut for Montreal on August 13, 2008, against Rochester Rhinos.   

In 2009, he returned to play with Trois-Rivières Sélect. He finished the season as the top goal scorer in the LSEQ. 

In 2012, he played in the newly formed Première Ligue de soccer du Québec (PLSQ) with FC L'Assomption-Lanaudière where he recorded the first goal in the history of the PLSQ.

International career 
Bessé was selected for the Québec official soccer team to participate in the 2013 International Peoples, Cultures, and Tribes Tournament held in Marseille, France. He made his international debut for Québec on June 25, 2013, against Provence in the International Peoples, Cultures, and Tribes Tournament.

Managerial career 
In 2009, he was appointed the technical director for Les Dragons de Drummondville.

Honours

Club
Trois-Rivières Attak
 Open Canada Cup: 2007
 National Division Champions: 2008

References

1980 births
Living people
Footballers from Abidjan
Canadian soccer players
Ivorian footballers
Ivorian emigrants to Canada
Canadian Soccer League (1998–present) players
Association football midfielders
Trois-Rivières Attak players
Montreal Impact (1992–2011) players
Laval Dynamites players
Première ligue de soccer du Québec players
FC L'Assomption players